Waking Hours is the second studio album by Scottish alternative rock band Del Amitri, released in July 1989 by A&M Records. It reached number 6 in the UK Albums Chart and featured one of the band's most famous songs, "Nothing Ever Happens", which reached number 11 in the UK Singles Chart. The album's opening track, "Kiss This Thing Goodbye", entered the top 40 of the US Billboard Hot 100 when released as a single for the second time.

History 
Many Del Amitri fans consider Waking Hours to be the band's first "real" album. The post-punk influence of the first album, Del Amitri (1985), had produced a sound radically different to the remainder of the band's output. The first album had been extremely difficult to find for many years, before its 2003 CD reissue, leaving many who became fans in the 1990s totally unaware of its existence. Waking Hours arguably represents Del Amitri's first "mature" record, and was certainly the first to bring them any mainstream success.

Typically for Del Amitri (the group never made two albums with the same band members), Waking Hours featured some recently introduced personnel: new guitarist Mick Slaven and keyboard player Andy Alston, who would become a full member after the album's release. Despite some important creative input (he contributed to the writing of "Kiss This Thing Goodbye" and "Hatful Of Rain") Slaven left the band before the album had even been released and was replaced by David Cummings. It would also be the last record for drummer Paul Tyagi, who was replaced by Brian McDermott. Both Cummings and McDermott appear on the album's front cover despite not having played on it.

Recording 
On the heels of a US tour in 1986, where Del Amitri had absorbed classic rock radio and picked up a diverse range of musical influences, the band began a musical evolution during an intensive period of songwriting. From taking inspiration from band's such as the Fall, the Smiths, R.E.M. and the Feelies, they now started listening to Creedence Clearwater Revival, Tom Petty and the Heartbreakers, John Mellencamp as well as country-influenced artists like Steve Earle and Lyle Lovett. "We always said that our "transformation" from indie art pop to mainstream pop rock was a natural thing," singer and bassist Justin Currie said in 2010. "Iain [Harvie] and I started writing separately instead of with the rest of the band, and our stuff sounded much more accessible and probably Americanized. Iain's guitar playing loosened up, started embracing blues and rock... And we then brought in a famous Glasgow guitarist called Mick Slaven, who plays like Robert Quine meets Nile Rogers meets Marc Bolan meets Jimi Hendrix. That we should sound a little different from before was inevitable."  

Del Amitri made their first recordings with their new lineup in spring 1987, recording the tracks "Move Away Jimmy Blue" and "Talk It to Death" with producer Gil Norton at Park Lane studios in Glasgow. The sessions also produced a handful of demos, which led to a bidding war among various labels, and the eventual signing with A&M Records later in the year. In 1988, unsuccessful attempts in London and Los Angeles with producer David Kershenbaum at recording what would become Waking Hours, left the band frustrated and disillusioned. The only track not scrapped from these sessions was the future B-side "The Return of Maggie Brown". But with the arrival of producer Hugh Jones, the project got back on track and recordings of "Nothing Ever Happens", "Empty" and "You're Gone" took place at Chipping Norton Recording Studios in Oxfordshire. Later, due to Jones' commitment to other projects, engineer Mark Freegard took over production and recorded the remaining tracks for the album at Great Linford Manor in Milton Keynes. By early 1989, recording for the album was completed. 

Drummer Paul Tyagi, who left the band during the recording of Waking Hours, was replaced in the studio by Stephen Irvine of Lloyd Cole and the Commotions, who contributed drums to five tracks, including "Stone Cold Sober". "Kiss This Thing Goodbye" and "Opposite View" feature drum programming. Bassists James O'Malley (of Fire Next Time) and Currie's occasional session stand-in Nick Clark, were drafted in for the album. "The new songs demanded pretty tight bass playing and I really couldn't get my head round it then," Currie said in 1992. "But in the end I played on about five songs on the album."

Track listing

2014 expanded edition 
Disc 1 
as per the original album

Personnel
Credits adapted from the album liner notes.

Del Amitri
 Justin Currie – vocals, bass
 Iain Harvie – guitar
 Mick Slaven – guitar
 Paul Tyagi – percussion, drums
Additional musicians
 Andy Alston – piano, organ
 Blair Cowan – accordion, synthesizer
 Will Mowat – sequencing, keyboards
Nick Clark – bass (thanked in the album credits for "invisible bass guitar")
 James O'Malley – bass
 Stephen Irvine – drums
 Julian Dawson – harmonica
 Robert Cairns – violin
 Caroline Lavelle – cello
Technical 
 Mark Freegard – producer (1, 2, 4, 6, 7, 9), additional recording (3, 5, 8, 10)
 Gil Norton – producer (3)
 Hugh Jones – producer (5, 8, 10)
 Julian Mendelsohn – mixing
 Kevin Westenberg – photography
 Sarah Southin – design
 Jeremy Pearce – design

Charts

Certifications

References

External links
 Official Del Amitri homepage
 

Del Amitri albums
1989 albums
A&M Records albums
Albums produced by Gil Norton
Albums produced by Hugh Jones (producer)